Spark Therapeutics, Inc. is a developer of gene therapy treatments, which treat debilitating genetic diseases. It is a subsidiary of Hoffmann-La Roche.

History
The company was founded in 2013 by Katherine A. High, Jeffrey Marrazzo, and Steven Altschuler in an effort to commercially develop treatments against haemophilia that High was working on at Children's Hospital of Philadelphia.

In January 2015, the company became a public company, trading under the ticker $ONCE via a $161 million initial public offering led by Chief Legal Officer Joseph La Barge.

In December 2017, the U.S. Food and Drug Administration approved LUXTURNATM (voretigene neparvovec-rzyl) for the treatment of patients with viable retinal cells and confirmed biallelic RPE65 mutation-associated retinal dystrophy, a genetic blinding condition caused by mutations in the RPE65 gene. The company is currently developing several gene therapies to target a suite of diseases, including Haemophilia A and B, and several central nervous system diseases.

In December 2019, the company was acquired by Hoffmann-La Roche for $4.3 billion. It now continues to operate as an independent subsidiary. 
 Since the acquisition by Swiss pharma Roche, several key founding executives have departed, including scientist and co-founder Katherine High in February 2020, Chief Business/Legal Officer Joseph La Barge in December 2021, and co-founder and Chief Executive Officer Jeffrey Marrazzo in April 2022 

On February 23, 2022, Marrazzo named big-Pharma veteran Ron Philip as his successor. Mr. Philip currently leads the organization.

Products and pipeline
The company has 3 gene therapy product candidates in clinical development: (i) SPK-8011, a candidate in the SPK-FVIII program for hemophilia A; (ii) SPK-8016, a product candidate for the hemophilia A inhibitor market; and (iii) SPK-7001, targeting choroideremia, or CHM. SPK-9001, a lead product candidate in the SPK-FIX program for hemophilia B, is being developed in partnership with Pfizer.

Voretigene neparvovec
Voretigene neparvovec, marketed under the tradename Luxturna, is a gene therapy approved by the Food and Drug Administration for treatment of Leber's congenital amaurosis, a rare genetic eye disease.

Fidanacogene elaparvovec
Fidanacogene elaparvovec, previously known by its study ID number SPK-9001, is an experimental drug under investigation for treatment of hemophilia B in partnership with Pfizer. Fidanacogene elaparvovec is an adeno-associated viral vector which is designed to transfer a working copy of the Factor IX gene into the livers of patients who carry non-functioning copies. In July 2018, fidanacogene elaparvovec entered late stage clinical trials.

SPK-8011
SPK-8011 is an experimental drug under investigation for treatment of Haemophilia A. It is entering phase III clinical trials in the United States. The therapy transfers a working copy of the Factor VIII gene into patients who lack one. In Phase II clinical trials, 2 of 7 patients receiving the highest dose of the drug suffered immune responses. One patient had to be hospitalized. The reactions against the treatment were seen as a set-back, though Spark suggested that the responses could be controlled with steroids, and promised to move forward with Phase III testing.

SPK-7001
SPK-7001 is an experimental drug under investigation for treatment of choroideremia, a genetic disorder that causes blindness.

SPK-3006
SPK-3006 is an experimental drug under investigation for treatment of Pompe disease, a genetic disorder that leads to failure to correctly metabolize glycogen.

SPK-1001
SPK-1001 is an experimental drug under investigation for treatment of Batten disease, a fatal genetic, nervous system disorder.

References

External links
 

Biotechnology companies of the United States
Pharmaceutical companies of the United States
Biopharmaceutical companies
Haemophilia
Pharmaceutical companies established in 2013
Biotechnology companies established in 2013
2013 establishments in Pennsylvania
Companies based in Philadelphia
Health care companies based in Pennsylvania
Virotherapy
Companies formerly listed on the Nasdaq
2015 initial public offerings
2019 mergers and acquisitions
Roche
American subsidiaries of foreign companies